Ruth Chang is the Professor and Chair of Jurisprudence at the University of Oxford, a Professorial Fellow of University College, Oxford, and an American professor of philosophy. She was previously a professor at Rutgers University from 1998 to 2019. She is known for her research on the incommensurability of values and on practical reason and normativity. She is also widely known for her work on decision-making and is lecturer or consultant on choice at institutions ranging from video-gaming to pharmaceuticals, the U.S. Navy, World Bank, and CIA.

Education and career
Chang has a B.A. degree from Dartmouth College, a J.D. from Harvard Law School, and a D.Phil. from the University of Oxford. At the beginning of her graduate work at Oxford in 1991, she was appointed a junior research fellow at Balliol College, Oxford, during which she also held visiting appointments at the UCLA philosophy department and the University of Chicago Law School. Prior to joining Oxford as the professor of jurisprudence in 2019, she was a professor of philosophy at Rutgers University in the United States.

Chang was a Nicolas Berggruen Fellow at the Stanford University Center for Advanced Study in the Behavioral Sciences. and has received a number of fellowship awards including at the National Humanities Center, the Harvard University Edmond J. Safra Center for Ethics at the Kennedy School of Government, the Princeton University Center for Human Values, and the American Council of Learned Societies. She was a Scot's Centenary Fellow in Scotland, which involved a lecture tour around Scotland. Her work has been recognized by a National Endowment for the Humanities Public Scholar Award and an American Philosophical Association Op-ed Prize. She was elected a Fellow of the American Academy of Arts and Sciences in April 2021.

Philosophical work
Chang's principal research interests lie in normative ethics, metaethics, action theory and moral psychology. Her work focuses on practical conflict, the nature of reasons and values and their relations, and rational agency. She is known for arguing that the structure of value is not what is commonly assumed: like space and time, which is not structured as we think it is, the normative and evaluative realm is not structured as we think it is. In particular, she is known for arguing that two items which are neither better nor worse than one another and yet not equally good may nevertheless be comparable: they may be 'on a par'. If correct, her view has wide-ranging implications for axiology, normative theory, decision theory, economic choice theory, and rationality. Her work also develops a view of rational agency, 'hybrid voluntarism', according to which rational agents are not merely discoverers of reasons but creators of them through the activity of commitment. She has also written on value pluralism and social choice. She has given various public lectures on decision-making, love, and commitment.

Chang is the author of Making Comparisons Count, and the editor of the first volume on the topic of incommensurability of values in the Anglo-American world, Incommensurability, Incomparability, and Practical Reason, and has authored numerous articles and book chapters.

Ruth Chang is also widely known for her work on 'hard choices' and decision-making, and her research has been the subject of radio, newspaper, and magazine articles around the world. Her TED talk on the subject has had over 7 million views, and her ideas have been presented in many popular publications.

Selected works
 Incommensurability, Incomparability and Practical Reason (Cambridge: Harvard University Press, 1997) 
 Making Comparisons Count (New York: Routledge, 2001), Studies in Ethics, series editor, Robert Nozick. 
 "The Possibility of Parity" 112 Ethics July 2002, pp. 659–88.
 "All Things Considered" 18 Philosophical Perspectives, December 2004, pp. 1–22
 "Voluntarist Reasons and the Sources of Normativity", Reasons for Action eds., Sobel and Wall, (New York: Cambridge University Press, 2009), pp. 243–71
 "Commitments, Reasons, and the Will", in Shafer-Landau, ed., Oxford Studies in Metaethics, vol. 8, 2013
 "Grounding Practical Normativity: Going Hybrid", Philosophical Studies, 2013

References

External links
 
 Ruth Chang website
 Ruth Chang home page at Rutgers

Living people
1963 births
People from Minneapolis
Philosophers from Minnesota
Dartmouth College alumni
Harvard Law School alumni
Alumni of the University of Oxford
Fellows of Balliol College, Oxford
Rutgers University faculty
American women philosophers
21st-century American philosophers
American ethicists
Moral psychology
Fellows of University College, Oxford
Professors of Jurisprudence (University of Oxford)
American expatriates in England
21st-century American women